Avenue de Wagram is a street in the 8th and 17th arrondissements of Paris, extending from the Place de Wagram to the Place Charles de Gaulle (formerly Place de l'Étoile, and the site of the Arc de Triomphe). It was renamed on 2 March 1864 after Napoleon's 1809 victory at the Battle of Wagram; the section between Avenue des Ternes and the Place de l'Étoile was formerly known as Boulevard de l'Étoile or Boulevard de Bezons and the section between Avenue des Ternes and Place de Wagram, as Route départementale n°6.

History
The street was first opened on 16 January 1789 between Rue de Tilsitt and Rue du Faubourg-Saint-Honoré, then on 13 August 1854 was extended to the Place de l'Étoile.

Buildings

Surviving
Salle Wagram

Destroyed

Notable inhabitants
 Prosper d'Épinay (1836–1914), sculptor (n° 26, in 1910).
 René Lenormand (1846–1932), composer, father of Henri-René Lenormand (1882–1951), playwright (n° 29, 5th floor).
 Madame de Thèbes (1845–1916), clairvoyant and palm reader (n° 29) 
 Albert Roussel, composer (lived at n° 157 in the 1920s).

Notes and references

8th arrondissement of Paris
17th arrondissement of Paris
Wagram